The final of the Men's Hammer Throw event at the 2006 European Championships in Gothenburg, Sweden was held on Saturday August 12, 2006. There were a total number of 24 participating athletes. The qualifying rounds were staged three days earlier, on Wednesday August 9, with the mark set in 77.50 metres.

Ivan Tsikhan had originally won the gold medal but later tested for doping and all his results between 22 August 2004 and 21 August 2006 were annulled.

Medalists

Schedule
All times are Central European Time (UTC+1)

Abbreviations
All results shown are in metres

Records

Qualification

Group A

Group B

Final

See also
 2006 Hammer Throw Year Ranking

References
 todor66
 hammerthrow.wz
 Official results

Hammer throw
Hammer throw at the European Athletics Championships